Hormazábal is a surname. Notable people with the surname include:

Enrique Hormazábal (1931–1999), Chilean footballer
Francisco Hormazábal (1920—1990), Chilean footballer and manager
Guillermo Hormazábal (born 1985), Chilean tennis player
Luis Hormazábal (born 1959), Chilean footballer